Shirzadabad (also Romanized as Shīrzādābād) is a village in Haft Ashiyan Rural District, Kuzaran District, Kermanshah County, Kermanshah Province, Iran. At the 2006 census, its population was 42, in 10 families.

References 

Populated places in Kermanshah County